Bart de Groot (born 16 April 1990) is a Dutch professional footballer who plays as a midfielder. He formerly played for FC Emmen.

External links
 Voetbal International profile 

1990 births
Living people
Dutch footballers
FC Emmen players
Eerste Divisie players
People from De Wolden
Association football midfielders
SC Heerenveen players
Footballers from Drenthe